Sianhala (also spelled Sanhala) is a town in northern Ivory Coast. It is a sub-prefecture of Kouto Department in Bagoué Region, Savanes District. The town is four kilometres east of the border of Denguélé District.

Sianhala was a commune until March 2012, when it became one of 1126 communes nationwide that were abolished.

In 2014, the population of the sub-prefecture of Sianhala was 27,076.

Villages
The 8 villages of the sub-prefecture of Sianhala and their population in 2014 are:
 Kelegbala (4 182)
 Mougnini (5 246)
 N'deou (6 228)
 Douasso (3 166)
 Sianhala (2 696)
 Tinasso (3 604)
 Zanasso1 (1 263)
 Zanasso2 (691)

Notes

Sub-prefectures of Bagoué
Former communes of Ivory Coast